Chamrao Parbat I (Hindi:चमराओ पर्वत I) is a mountain of the Garhwal Himalaya in Uttarakhand India. It is 22nd highest located entirely within the Uttrakhand. Nanda Devi, is the highest mountain in this category. Chamrao Parbat I lies between the Mukut Parbat and Saraswati Parbat I. It lies on the India China border. It is located 9.9 km NW of Kamet  and 5.3 km NNW lies Saraswati Parbat I .

Glaciers and rivers
Near by glaciers and river

Dakshini Chamrao glacier, Balbala glacier and Paschimi Kamet glacier all the glacier drain their water in the Saraswati river which then joins Alaknanda River near Mana village one of the main tributaries of Ganga river.

Neighboring peaks

Neighboring peaks of Chamrao Parbat I:
 Kamet:  
 Abi Gamin:  
 Mukut Parbat: 
 Saraswati Parbat I: 
 Balbala:

See also

 List of Himalayan peaks of Uttarakhand

References

Mountains of Uttarakhand
Six-thousanders of the Himalayas
Geography of Chamoli district